The 2022–23 Bowling Green Falcons men's ice hockey season is the 54th season of play for the program and the 44th in the Central Collegiate Hockey Association. The Falcons represent Bowling Green State University and are led by Ty Eigner in his 4th season.

Season
Bowling Green began the season with a decent performance in the first two weeks, splitting a pair of series with above-average opponents. In week 3, however, the team's hopes were dealt a massive blow when starting goaltender, Zack Rose, suffered a torn labrum and missed the remainder of the season. Coach Ty Eigner turned to Christian Stoever to man the pipes but the sophomore got off to a rocky start. After a week off, Stoever looked much more comfortable in the cage against Minnesota State and, though the team lost both games, the results were much more promising.

With Stoever settling into the starting role, the Falcons had to address another of their early-season problems; a lack of scoring. After scoring 6 goals in the opener, BG averaged just 2 goals per game over the next eight matches. Unsurprisingly, the team got off to a 2–7 start as a result. Once November rolled around, however, the offense began to coalesce around Austen Swankler and started scoring. After the poor start, the Falcons won six out of seven and brought themselves back up to .500. The team had a chance to establish itself a potential NCAA contender with a slate of 4 games against ranked teams to end the first half of their season. Unfortunately, BG lost each contest and were only close in one of the matches.

With their chances for an at-large bid near zero, Bowling Green kicked off the second half of its season with a 6-game winning streak that put it atop the CCHA standings. However, the Falcons were unable to keep their position and won just once in their final eight games. Despite the skid, the Falcons earned a home site for the quarterfinals and faced off against Ferris State. The two teams were evenly matched throughout both games though BG needed to score late to tie the score on both occasions. Unfortunately, the Bulldogs ended up with an overtime goal twice and upset the Falcons.

Departures

Recruiting

Roster
As of August 6, 2022.

Standings

Schedule and results

|-
!colspan=12 style=";" | Regular Season

|- style="background:#bbbbbb"
| October 22
| 7:00 PM
| vs. Adrian
| align=center|
| Slater Family Ice Arena • Bowling Green, Ohio (Exhibition)
| 
| colspan=5 rowspan=1 style="text-align:center"|Cancelled 

|-
!colspan=12 style=";" |

Scoring statistics

Goaltending statistics

Rankings

Note: USCHO did not release a poll in weeks 1, 13, or 26.

References

2022-23
Bowling Green
Bowling Green
Bowling Green
Bowling Green